Viviana Serna (born Viviana Serna Ramírez on August 26, 1990 in Cali, Colombia) is an actress. She is based in Mexico City.

Viviana Serna, born in Colombia, started her acting career at the age of 13 as a host for Colombian local TV.  She quickly began working in theater and television, yet at 19 years old, Viviana booked a series regular role in the TV series Confidencial.  Soon after, Viviana booked the role of “Solita” in La Bruja (TV series).
She can also be seen in La viuda negra, La ronca de oro, ¿Quién Eres Tú? and most recently she made in the Mexican the TV series El Señor de los Cielos and Guerra de ídolos.
 
Viviana shot the role of "Giselle" in Between Sea and Land, 2016 Sundance Film Festival award - winning movie. Same year she won the award for best supporting actress in the 2016 Scottsdale international film festival.

Filmography

References

External links 

Mini-Site

1990 births
Living people
Colombian telenovela actresses
Colombian television actresses
Colombian film actresses
21st-century Colombian actresses
Colombian expatriates in Mexico